Paulina Cruceanu (1865–1921), was a Romanian pharmacist.

She was the first female pharmacist in Romania (1891).

References

1865 births
1921 deaths
Pharmacists
Women pharmacists
19th-century Romanian women